The 1997 North Queensland Cowboys season was the 3rd in the club's history. Coached by Tim Sheens and captained by Ian Roberts, they competed in the breakaway News Limited-run competition, the Telstra Cup.

Season summary 
After an improved 1996 season, the club pulled off a major coup in signing three-time premiership winning coach Tim Sheens from the Canberra Raiders, who brought five players with him from his old club, including Australia and Queensland representative hooker Steve Walters. Former Australia and New South Wales prop Ian Roberts was brought in as captain as part of a major off-season rebuild in which 20 players were let go, including a number of foundation players.

The club, who were competing in News Limited's breakaway Super League competition, got off to a promising start after defeating the newly formed Adelaide Rams in the opening round of the season. The good times under Sheens and his new signings were short lived, as a four game losing streak followed. A win over the Auckland Warriors in Round 9 was followed by two consecutive draws, which included a 20-all draw against arch-rivals Brisbane, their best ever result against them at the time.

Back-to-back wins in Round 14 and 15 had the Cowboys sitting just four points outside the Top 5, but a three-game losing streak to end the season left the club languishing in last place. The Cowboys recorded their second wooden spoon in three seasons, with just five wins from 18 games. Despite the disappointing year, Tim Sheens signed a five-year contract renewal with the club. Owen Cunningham, an off-season recruit from Manly, was named the club's Player of the Year.

Towards the end of the season, the club took part in the World Club Championship. The tournament featured all 22 clubs from the Australasian and Super League competitions and was contested over six rounds in two hemispheres. The Cowboys played home and away games against three Super League clubs; (Leeds Rhinos, Oldham Bears and Salford Reds), winning all but once (a 16-20 loss to Oldham at Boundary Park). Despite the great results, the Cowboys missed out on the finals, while clubs in other pools got through without even winning a game. It would be the last time the club would face a Super League side or play a game in England until the 2016 World Club Challenge.

Milestones 
 Round 1: Dion Cope, Owen Cunningham, Jason Ferris, John Lomax, Scott Mahon, Ray Mercy, Luke Phillips, Ian Roberts, Tyran Smith, Bert Tabuai and Steve Walters made their debuts for the club.
 Round 1: Kyle Warren made his first grade debut.
 Round 2: Jimmy Ahmat and Mark Shipway made their first grade debuts.
 Round 4: John Doyle made his first grade debut.
 Round 6: Luke Scott made his first grade debut.
 Round 7: Jason Ryan made his debut for the club.
 Round 7: Adam Warwick made his first grade debut.
 Round 11: Shane Vincent made his debut for the club.
 Round 14: Ray Mercy became the first player to score three tries in a match for the club.

Squad list 
In Super League, players were able to choose their own jersey number (regardless of their starting position), which they wore for the entire season.

Squad movement

1997 Gains

1997 Losses

Ladder

Fixtures

Regular season

World Club Championship 

The World Club Championship was a mid-season tournament featuring all 22 clubs from the Australasian and Super League competitions. It was contested over six rounds in two hemispheres from 6 June to 11 October.

Pool Play

Statistics 

Source:

Representatives 
The following players played a representative match in 1997.

Honours

Club 
 Player of the Year: Owen Cunningham
 Players' Player: John Lomax
 Club Person of the Year: Ian Roberts

References 

North Queensland Cowboys seasons
North Queensland Cowboys